Liu Guchang (born 1946 in Jiangsu) was the Ambassador Extraordinary and Plenipotentiary of the People's Republic of China to the Russian Federation from 2003 to 2009. He also served as China's Vice Minister of Foreign Affairs.

See also 
 Embassy of the People's Republic of China in Moscow

References 

Ambassadors of China to Russia
1946 births
Living people
People's Republic of China politicians from Jiangsu